House on Haunted Hill is a 1999 American supernatural horror film directed by William Malone and starring Geoffrey Rush, Famke Janssen, Taye Diggs, Ali Larter, Bridgette Wilson, Peter Gallagher, and Chris Kattan. The plot follows a group of strangers who are invited to a party at an abandoned insane asylum, where they are offered $1 million each by an amusement park mogul if they are able to survive the night. Produced by Robert Zemeckis and Joel Silver, it is a remake of the 1959 film of the same title directed by William Castle, and features special effects by famed make-up artists Gregory Nicotero and Dick Smith.

House on Haunted Hill marked the producing debut of Dark Castle Entertainment, a production company that went on to produce numerous other horror films, including additional remakes. House on Haunted Hill premiered on Halloween weekend in 1999.

In the tradition of William Castle's theater gimmicks, Warner Bros. Pictures supplied promotional scratchcards to cinemas showing the film, offering ticket buyers a chance to win a money prize, similar to the movie's characters. The film received middling reviews from major critics, but was a commercial success, opening number one at the box office and grossing $43 million worldwide.

In 2007, the film was followed by a direct-to-DVD sequel, Return to House on Haunted Hill, which was released in both rated and unrated editions.

Plot 
In 1931, the patients at the Vannacutt Psychiatric Institute for the Criminally Insane revolt against the staff headed by the sadistic Dr. Richard B. Vannacutt. The patients start a fire which engulfs the building, killing all of the inmates and all but five of Vannacutt’s staff.

In 1999, Evelyn Stockard-Price is in a disintegrating marriage with Steven Price, an amusement park mogul. At Evelyn's insistence, Price stages her birthday party at the long-abandoned hospital. The building's owner, Watson Pritchett, is convinced it is evil, having lived there as a child when it was converted to a private residence. Five guests arrive for the party: film producer Jennifer Jenzen; baseball player Eddie Baker; former television personality Melissa Marr; Donald Blackburn, a physician; and Pritchett himself. The guests are not the ones Price invited and neither of the Prices know who they are. Despite this, Price continues the party's advertised theme, offering $1 million to each guest who remains in the house until morning; those who flee forfeit their $1 million to the others.

The building's security system is mysteriously tripped, locking everyone inside – a stunt which Price blames on Evelyn. Jennifer, Eddie and Pritchett search the basement for the control panel. While exploring the labyrinthine basement, Jennifer confesses to Eddie that her real name is Sara Wolfe, the recently fired assistant to the real Jennifer. She impersonated Jennifer hoping to win the prize money. Shortly after, Sara is nearly drowned in a tank of blood by a ghost impersonating Eddie, but the real Eddie arrives in time to save her. Melissa subsequently disappears, leaving behind a massive trail of blood. Price visits his assistant Schechter, who is supposed to be managing the party stunts, but finds him horribly mutilated. On the surveillance monitor he sees the ghost of Dr. Vannacutt walking around with a bloody saw.

Evelyn seemingly dies in front of the others, strapped to an electroshock therapy table. Price pulls a gun on the guests, demanding to know who killed his wife. Eddie knocks him out and they lock Price in the "Saturation Chamber", an archaic zoetrope device that Vannacutt used to treat schizophrenics. Blackburn volunteers to guard Price. When the others leave, he turns the chamber on, leaving Price to be tortured by the moving images and ghostly hallucinations. In Vannacutt's office, Sara and Eddie find a portrait of the hospital's head staff and realize that the party guests are descendants of the five survivors of the 1931 fire. Pritchett deduces that the spirits themselves hacked the guest list on Price's computer. The only exception is Blackburn, whose name does not appear among the staff.

Blackburn is revealed as Evelyn's lover. They have faked Evelyn's death, plotting to frame Price for the murders, hoping one of the guests will kill him in self-defense. Evelyn heartlessly kills Blackburn, adding another victim, then releases a delirious Price from the chamber. Sara finds Price, covered in blood and with Blackburn's severed head nearby, and shoots him. Eddie and Pritchett arrive and bring Sara upstairs, after which Evelyn approaches Price to gloat. Price, protected by a bulletproof vest and posing as dead, attacks Evelyn. As they scuffle, Evelyn is thrown through a decaying door, revealing the evil entity of the house – The Darkness.

The shape-shifting creature, composed of the spirits in the house, consumes Evelyn, adding her spirit to its mass. Price then discovers Melissa's body. Shortly after, Pritchett is also killed by The Darkness, allowing Price to flee. Price tells Sara and Eddie that the only escape is through the attic. The Darkness seeps through the house, following them. Price opens a window in the attic, then sacrifices himself to give the others time to escape. Sara gets out, but The Darkness closes an iron gate, trapping Eddie.

As The Darkness entity prepares to assimilate Eddie, he reveals that he is adopted, and not a true descendant of the original staff. Pritchett's ghost appears and opens the iron gate. The Darkness is distracted by Pritchett long enough for Eddie to escape. Pritchett's ghost and The Darkness fade away as Sara and Eddie watch the sun rise. They find an envelope on the ledge, containing all five checks, made out to cash.

In a post-credits scene, a black and white film is shown, depicting the spirits of the 1931 patients torturing the Prices for eternity.

Cast 

 Geoffrey Rush as Steven H. Price
 Famke Janssen as Evelyn Stockard-Price
 Taye Diggs as Eddie Baker
 Peter Gallagher as Donald W. Blackburn, M.D.
 Chris Kattan as Watson Pritchett
 Ali Larter as Sara Wolfe
 Bridgette Wilson as Melissa Margaret Marr
 Max Perlich as Carl Schecter
 Jeffrey Combs as Dr. Richard Benjamin Vannacutt
 Lisa Loeb as Channel 3 reporter
 James Marsters as Channel 3 cameraman
 Peter Graves as Himself

Rush's name "Price" as well as Rush's appearance is a nod to actor Vincent Price, who played the similar lead role, then named Frederick Loren in the original film.

Production

Concept 

House on Haunted Hill was the first film produced by American production company Dark Castle Entertainment. Joel Silver and Robert Zemeckis had discussed remaking William Castle's 1959 film as early as 1997. Castle's daughter Terry Castle served as co-producer on the remake. Director William Malone was a fan of the original film, which he had seen in his childhood, which served as the impetus for his directing. Malone and producer Dick Beebe worked on the film's screenplay for a year and a half. According to Malone, he wrote approximately twenty percent of the screenplay, though he did not take a writing credit on it.

Co-producer Gilbert Adler noted that he felt the film was "totally different" from the original, but retained the spirit of the original, in terms of "how we're telling the story, and the basic tenets of the story itself. We contemporize it as much as possible." The unethical psychiatry methods and experimental procedures featured in the film were loosely based on medical experiments conducted by the Nazis.

Casting 
Geoffrey Rush signed on to appear as Steven Price, the theme park mogul in the film. Taye Diggs was subsequently cast as Eddie, the ex-professional baseball player attending the party, and agreed to appear in the film after Rush signed onto the project. Ali Larter, who had previously appeared in Varsity Blues (1999), was cast as Sara Wolfe, a woman who poses as her ex-boss, film executive Jennifer Jensen; the film marked Larter's third screen appearance. Famke Janssen was cast as Price's aloof wife, while Saturday Night Live star Chris Kattan was cast as Watson Pritchett, the caretaker of the building. Terry Castle stated that Kattan was cast in the part for the sake of comic relief, and that the filmmakers allowed Kattan to "just [be] who he is."

Filming 
The film was shot in late 1998 and early 1999 in Los Angeles, California, with exteriors of the house's driveway being shot in Griffith Park near the Griffith Park Observatory.  Adler commented on the unorthodox nature of the house: "Instead of being a typical sort of haunted house, this [one] is much more modern, with a touch of Deco. It's not what you'd expect to see." Larter stated in an on-set interview: "The set is dark and dirty, and everyone's been sick, and [Taye Diggs] and Chris [Kattan] keep me laughing. We really have had a good time."

The "Terror Incognita" roller coaster at Price's amusement park featured in the beginning of the film is actually The Incredible Hulk Coaster at Universal's Islands of Adventure theme park at Universal Orlando Resort in Florida.

Visual effects 

Some reviewers noted that the surrealistic jerking, twitching effect of the ghosts featured in the film was similar to the effects in Adrian Lyne's film Jacob's Ladder (1990). The special effects in the film were designed by Gregory Nicotero and Robert Kurtzman, with additional makeup design by Dick Smith in his last film credit. One of the monster figures featured in the film during Price's underwater hallucination sequence was a creation of Smith's that was intended to be used in Ghost Story (1981) but was ultimately not featured. Malone, struck by the figure, which consisted of a human face consisting only of an enlarged mouth, was granted permission from Smith to use it in the film.

The tentacular morphing mass of ghosts featured at the film's climax was designed by KNB Effects, and was inspired by the visuals of H.P. Lovecraft's novels, as well as resembling the Rorschach inkblots used in psychiatry. According to Malone, much of the visual elements were actually not computer-generated, and were actually made up of footage shot by the production crew, which was grafted together to form the mass.

Other practical visual effects included the use of a spinning saw blade being held in front of a camera lens to achieve a fluttering look to the hallucinatory sequences experienced by Price in the Saturation Chamber.

Deleted footage 
Several key scenes were taken out of the final cut of the film. This included an exposition scene in which Sara Wolfe (Ali Larter) is fired by her boss, Jennifer Jenzen (played by Debi Mazar), the feisty vice president of a motion picture company. Two versions of the scene were shot, both taking place on a film set where Wolfe hands Jenzen a bag delivered for her; inside is a music box with a jack-in-a-box-trigger which cuts the handler's finger. Jenzen throws the box in the garbage, and Wolfe discovers the invitation to Price's party inside of it. This is why in the final cut of the film, Wolfe hesitantly introduces herself to Price as Jennifer Jenzen; in the final cut of the film, she later confesses to Eddie Baker about posing as Jenzen in order to receive her $1,000,000, but details surrounding the circumstances in which she received the invitation are sparsely revealed.

Another scene removed from the film last-minute, according to director Malone, was a scene in which Wolfe falls through a collapsing floor when she and Baker are being chased by the Darkness. After falling two stories below, Wolfe awakens in a subterranean crematorium filled with the ashes and corpses of the hospital's dead patients. There, she is attacked by reanimated corpses who rise out of the ashes, terrorizing her and tearing off her overcoat. As a result of the scene's removal, there remains a continuity error in the final cut of the film, in which Wolfe's overcoat disappears from her body in-between scenes.

A final epilogue scene completing the Jennifer Jenzen story arc was also filmed, featuring Jenzen arriving at the house with a realtor, which she was claimed to now inherited. As she enters the front door, a bloodcurdling scream is heard, and the realtor is revealed to be Dr. Vannacutt. Director Malone said the scene ultimately was removed after the cutting of Jenzen's exposition scene, as well as for having a comical tone that did not fit with the rest of the film.

All three deleted scenes from the film were included on the 2000 Warner Bros. Home Video release of the film on DVD in the bonus features section.

Release

Promotion 
In keeping with the spirit of William Castle's tradition of releasing each of his films with a marketing gimmick, Warner Bros. and Dark Castle supplied movie theatres with scratch-off tickets that would be given to moviegoers. The scratch-off ticket would give each patron a chance to win money, like the characters in the film. The cash prizes totaled $1 million, including rentals from Blockbuster.

Dark Castle had originally intended to release each of their films with a gimmick much like Castle had done. They had considered releasing the remake Thirteen Ghosts in 3-D with special glasses similar to the ones used by the characters in the film. These plans were scrapped and House on Haunted Hill remains the only film released with a special marketing gimmick.

Box office 
House on Haunted Hill premiered in Los Angeles on October 27, 1999, at the Mann Village Theater. Janssen, Kattan, Larter and Wilson were in attendance with director Malone, as well as producers Silver and Adler.

It was released theatrically in the United States two days later, on October 29, opening at number one at the U.S. box office and earning over $15 million in sales its opening weekend.

Critical response 
House on Haunted Hill received generally negative reviews. In contrast to the original's 78% score on Rotten Tomatoes, the remake received a 31% rating, based on 62 reviews, with an average rating of 4.80/10. The site's consensus reads, "Unsophisticated and unoriginal film fails to produce scares." Metacritic reports a score of 28 out of 100, based on 17 critics, indicating "generally unfavorable reviews". Audiences polled by CinemaScore gave an average grade of "C" on an A+ to F scale.

Mick LaSalle of the San Francisco Chronicle said, "House on Haunted Hill is the kind of horror movie that's not a bit scary and quite a bit gross. Yet it's also mildly, even pleasantly, entertaining, at least by the diminished standard set by this summer's The Haunting ... [it] sets up hostile relationships between the characters, which allows the audience to wonder who is doing what to whom. Finding out is not so interesting, but getting there isn't so bad." Maitland McDonough of Film Journal gave the film a similar review, saying "The proceedings are all utterly conventional, but watching them unfold is mildly diverting if you're in the right frame of mind, as many moviegoers apparently were over the Halloween weekend," also favorably comparing the film to Jan de Bont's remake of The Haunting, which was released several months prior.

Entertainment Weekly gave the film a B− rating, calling it "trash, but creepier than you expect." Joe Leydon of Variety gave the film a favorable review, noting its "cheap scares," but adding: "Given the irredeemable cheesiness of the original 1958 House on Haunted Hill, the makers of the remake had nowhere to go but up. So it's not exactly a stunning surprise to find the new horror opus is a slicker and scarier piece of work."

In their review, The New York Times called the film "a sorry reincarnation" of the original, and said: "This film wastes the talents of actors like Geoffrey Rush and Peter Gallagher in hollow roles and relies heavily on its sets and special effects to do the work that should have been accomplished by its director and writer." The Austin Chronicles Marc Savlov echoed a similar sentiment, writing: "The nicest thing I can say about this remake of William Castle's 1958 shocker is that Geoffrey Rush, god bless him, sure can do a fine imitation of Vincent Price's original mustache, even better than John Waters' -- which is no mean feat."

Accolades 
It was nominated for Worst Remake at the 1999 Stinkers Bad Movie Awards but lost to The Haunting.

Home media 
Warner Home Video released House on Haunted Hill on VHS and a special edition DVD in April 2000. On October 9, 2018, Scream Factory released the film on Blu-ray for the first time in North America as a collector's edition featuring new interviews with Malone and other crew, among various other features. This is the revered edition amongst fans, as previous releases had inferior transfers and colour palettes.

Soundtrack 

The soundtrack for the film was commercially released on the label Varèse Sarabande, containing selections from the original score by Don Davis.

Track listing

The song "Sweet Dreams (Are Made of This)" by Marilyn Manson is not on the soundtrack but plays during the scene lead up to the Asylum and end credits.

Sequel 

In 2007, the film was followed up with a direct-to-DVD sequel, Return to House on Haunted Hill, which was released in both rated and unrated editions. The film had no involvement from William Malone and received poor reviews, mainly due to plot holes, continuity in the building design and various other features of the film, but it was praised for its state-of-the-art Blu-Ray feature in which the viewer can change the path of the story.

See also 
 List of ghost films

References

Sources

External links 

 
 
 
 

1999 films
1999 horror films
1990s ghost films
Remakes of American films
American haunted house films
American supernatural horror films
Dark Castle Entertainment films
Films scored by Don Davis (composer)
Films directed by William Malone
Films produced by Joel Silver
Films shot in Florida
Films shot in Los Angeles
Films set in the 1930s
Films set in 1999
Horror film remakes
Warner Bros. films
Films based on works by Robb White
1990s English-language films
Films produced by Robert Zemeckis
Films produced by Gilbert Adler
1990s American films